Kulfi is a restaurant in Portland, Oregon.

Description 

Kulfi serves all-natural fruit popsicles inspired by the Indian frozen dairy desserts of the same name. Vegan varieties have included jackfruit-coconut-lime, spicy watermelon, and Vietnamese coffee using beans supplied by Portland Cà Phê. The menu has also included a ricotta raspberry cheesecake bar with graham cracker crumbles, as well as the flavors chai, marionberry cheesecake, pistachio, rose water, and saffron. The Cookie Monster variety has pieces of cookie.

The mango lassi variety, made with mango, sugar, and yogurt, is the most popular flavor, as of 2022. The cream soda float is an upside down mango lassi popsicle with orange soda, whipped cream, and sprinkles. The rainbow-colored Pride pop is seasonal. Kulfi made peanut butter Oreo popsicles for Zuckercreme's "summer camp" series in 2021.

The restaurant's interior features a tribute painting to Gabbar, the owner's late Labrador Retriever.

History 
Kulfi is owned by spouses Kiran Cheema and Gagan Aulakh. The business began during the COVID-19 pandemic as a pop-up restaurant, selling desserts as Kulfi Creamery and Kulfi PDX, as of mid 2021. The business operated at various locations and events, including the Come Thru Market, the Montavilla Farmers Market, and the Portland Flea, from a bicycle ice cream cart with a rainbow umbrella.

In 2022, Kulfi announced plans to open a brick and mortar shop on Alberta Street in northeast Portland's Vernon neighborhood on April 30, with four permanent and eight rotating flavors as well as falooda.

According to The Oregonian Lizzy Acker, Cheema makes 160 popsicles at a time.

Reception 
Waz Wu included Kulfi in Eater Portland 2021 list of "This Summer's Top Spots for Dairy-Free Frozen Treats", which focused on vegan desserts.

References

External links 

 
 

2021 establishments in Oregon
Ice cream parlors in the United States
Restaurants established in 2021
Restaurants in Portland, Oregon
Vernon, Portland, Oregon